The South Carolina Classic was a golf tournament on the Buy.com Tour from 1991 to 2000. It was played at the Country Club of South Carolina in Florence, South Carolina.

The purse in 2000 was US$400,000, with $72,000 going to the winner.

Winners

References

Former Korn Ferry Tour events
Golf in South Carolina
Recurring sporting events established in 1991
Recurring sporting events disestablished in 2000